Cezerye is a semi-gelatinous traditional Turkish dessert made from caramelised carrots, shredded coconut, and roasted walnuts, hazelnuts, or pistachios. Cut into matchbox-sized rectangular chips it is served on special occasions. It originated from the Eastern Mediterranean Turkish province of Mersin. Grated carrots are boiled first and then roasted with sugar, coconut powder is spread on it, and pistachios, hazelnuts, peanuts or walnuts are put in it. 

While variations on the treat exist which replace the carrot with fig or date purée, the name is nonetheless derived from the word "jazriyya," which is Arabic for "with carrot".

See also
 List of Turkish desserts

References

Carrot dishes
Confectionery
Turkish words and phrases
Turkish desserts